Hooligan Sparrow is a 2016  documentary film about Ye Haiyan and other Chinese activists written and produced by Nanfu Wang.

Synopsis
The documentary is about a child rape case in China (involving a government official) and the protests against it by activists Ye Haiyan, Shan Lihua, Tang Jitian, Wang Jianfen, Jia Lingmin, Wang Yu, and Huang. It is composed of footage captured surreptitiously, and smuggled out of the country, by Nanfu Wang.

References

External links

Hooligan Sparrow on POV

2016 films
2016 documentary films
Chinese documentary films
2010s Mandarin-language films
Films set in China
Documentary films about China
Documentary films about human rights
Films about activists
Films about child sexual abuse
Peabody Award-winning broadcasts
Chinese independent films
Films directed by Nanfu Wang